Zadraga is a village in the Municipality of Naklo in the Upper Carniola region of Slovenia.

References

External links

Zadraga on Geopedia

Populated places in the Municipality of Naklo